Jaime Sánchez Muñoz (born 11 March 1995) is a Spanish footballer who plays as a central defender for Deportivo La Coruña.

Club career
Born in Chiclana de la Frontera, Cádiz, Andalusia, Sánchez joined Real Madrid's La Fábrica in August 2012, from Cádiz CF, for a fee of €250,000. He made his senior debut with the former's C-team at the age of 17 on 24 March 2013, starting in a 1–2 Segunda División B away loss against Sporting de Gijón B.

Sánchez was promoted to the reserves for 2014–15, ending the season as a starter but subsequently suffering an injury which kept him out for the entire 2015–16 campaign. On 28 July 2016, he was loaned to fellow third division side CE Sabadell FC, but did not play after again struggling with injuries.

Sánchez only returned to action on 24 September 2017, in a 1–2 loss at CDA Navalcarnero, 861 days after his last official match. He spent the first half of the 2018–19 season unregistered, and subsequently moved to Real Valladolid's B-team on 31 January 2019.

On 18 June 2019, Sánchez renewed his contract with the Blanquivioletas until 2021. On 14 August of the following year, he returned to Sabadell, with his side now in Segunda División.

Sánchez made his professional debut on 19 September 2020, starting in a 1–2 away loss against Rayo Vallecano.

On 19 July 2021, Sánchez signed one-year deal with Deportivo La Coruña.

References

External links
Real Madrid profile

1995 births
Living people
People from Chiclana de la Frontera
Sportspeople from the Province of Cádiz
Spanish footballers
Footballers from Andalusia
Association football defenders
Segunda División players
Segunda División B players
Tercera División players
Real Madrid C footballers
Real Madrid Castilla footballers
CE Sabadell FC footballers
Real Valladolid Promesas players
Spain youth international footballers
Spain under-21 international footballers